O Jogo (English: The Game) is a Portuguese daily sport newspaper published in Porto.

History and profile
O Jogo was first published on 22 February 1985 by the Jornal de Notícias company in Porto, and it is seen as appealing mainly to supporters of FC Porto, being publicly criticized by Benfica, suppressing the gap of the two other national sports newspapers, A Bola and Record. O Jogo has also a Lisbon edition.

O Jogo is published in tabloid format. The paper was sold in 1995 to Lusomundo Media subsidiary Jornalinveste, which was later absorbed into Controlinveste in 2005 after Lusomundo Media merged with Olivedesportos, before renaming itself as Global Media Group in 2015.

Circulation
The circulation of O Jogo was 34,837 copies in 2002, 40,677 copies in 2003 and 49,809 copies in 2004. The circulation of the paper was 44,878 copies in 2005, 41,473 copies in 2006 and 35,976 copies in 2007. Its 2010 circulation was 28,900 copies.

Player of the Year

Teams of the Year
Since 2012, O Jogo has organised the Team of the Year award, which distinguishes the best 11 players of the calendar year of the Primeira Liga.

References

External links 
 

1985 establishments in Portugal
Mass media in Porto
Newspapers published in Portugal
Portuguese-language newspapers
Newspapers established in 1985
Sports mass media in Portugal
Sports newspapers